The 2020 Tormenta FC season is the club's fifth season of existence, and their second season as a professional club. It is their second season playing in the third tier of American soccer and their second season playing in USL League One (USL1). This article covers the period from October 20, 2019, the day after the 2019 USL1 Playoff Final, to the conclusion of the 2020 USL1 Playoff Final, scheduled for October 22–25, 2020.

Club

Roster

Competitions

Exhibitions

USL League One

Standings

Match results

U.S. Open Cup 

As a USL League One club, Tormenta will enter the competition in the Second Round, to be played April 7–9.

References

Tormenta FC seasons
Tormenta FC
Tormenta FC
Tormenta FC